Paneth cells are cells in the small intestine epithelium, alongside goblet cells, enterocytes, and enteroendocrine cells. Some can also be found in the cecum and appendix. They are below the intestinal stem cells in the intestinal glands (also called crypts of Lieberkühn) and the large eosinophilic refractile granules that occupy most of their cytoplasm.

These granules consist of several anti-microbial compounds and other compounds that are known to be important in immunity and host-defense. When exposed to bacteria or bacterial antigens, Paneth cells secrete some of these compounds into the lumen of the intestinal gland, thereby contributing to maintenance of the gastrointestinal barrier by controlling the enteric bacteria. Therefore, Paneth cells play a role in the innate immune system.

Paneth cells are named after 19th-century pathologist Joseph Paneth.

Structure 

Paneth cells are found throughout the small intestine and the appendix at the base of the intestinal glands. The Paneth cell increase in numbers towards the end of the small intestine. Like the other epithelial cell lineages in the small intestine, Paneth cells originate at the stem cell region near the bottom of the gland. There are on average 5–12 Paneth cells in each small intestinal crypt.

Unlike the other epithelial cell types, Paneth cells migrate downward from the stem cell region and settle just adjacent to it. This close relationship to the stem cell region suggests that Paneth cells are important in defending the gland stem cells from microbial damage, although their function is not entirely known. Furthermore, among the four aforementioned intestinal cell lineages, the Paneth cells live the longest (approximately 57 days).

Function 
Paneth cells secrete antimicrobial peptides and proteins, which are "key mediators of host-microbe interactions, including homeostatic balance with colonizing microbiota and innate immune protection from enteric pathogens."

Small intestinal crypts house stem cells that serve to constantly replenish epithelial cells that die and are lost from the villi. Paneth cells support the physical barrier of the epithelium by providing essential niche signals to their neighboring intestinal stem cells. Protection and stimulation of these stem cells is essential for long-term maintenance of the intestinal epithelium, in which Paneth cells play a critical role.

Sensing microbiota 
Paneth cells are stimulated to secrete defensins when exposed to bacteria (both Gram positive and Gram-negative types) or such bacterial products as lipopolysaccharide, lipoteichoic acid, muramyl dipeptide and lipid A. They are also stimulated by cholinergic signaling normally preceding the arrival of food and potentially a new bacterial load.

Paneth cells sense bacteria via MyD88-dependent toll-like receptor (TLR) activation which then triggers antimicrobial action. For example, research showed that in the secretory granules, murine and human Paneth cells express high levels of TLR9. TLR9 react to CpG-ODN and unmethylated oligonucleotides, pathogen-associated molecular patterns (PAMPs) typical for bacterial DNA. Internalizing these PAMPs and activating TLR9 leads to degranulation and release of antimicrobial peptides and other secretions. Surprisingly, murine Paneth cells do not express mRNA transcripts for TLR4.

Antimicrobial secretions 
The principal defense molecules secreted by Paneth cells are alpha-defensins, which are known as cryptdins in mice. These peptides have hydrophobic and positively charged domains that can interact with phospholipids in cell membranes. This structure allows defensins to insert into membranes, where they interact with one another to form pores that disrupt membrane function, leading to cell lysis. Due to the higher concentration of negatively charged phospholipids in bacterial than vertebrate cell membranes, defensins preferentially bind to and disrupt bacterial cells, sparing the cells they are functioning to protect.

Human Paneth cells produce two α-defensins known as human α-defensin HD-5 (DEFA5) and HD-6 (DEFA6). HD-5 has a wide spectrum of killing activity against both Gram positive and Gram negative bacteria as well as fungi (Listeria monocytogenes, Escherichia coli, Salmonella typhimurium, and Candida albicans). Antimicrobial activity of HD-6 consists in self-assembling into extracellular nets that entrap bacteria in the intestine and thereby prevent translocation across the epithelial barrier.

Human Paneth cells also produce other AMPs including lysozyme, secretory phospholipase A2, and regenerating islet-derived protein IIIA. Lysozyme is an antimicrobial enzyme that dissolves the cell walls of many bacteria, and phospholipase A2 is an enzyme specialized in the lysis of bacterial phospholipids. This battery of secretory molecules gives Paneth cells a potent arsenal against a broad spectrum of agents, including bacteria, fungi and even some enveloped viruses.

Epithelium maintenance 
Paneth cells participate in the Wnt signaling pathway and Notch signalling pathway, which regulate proliferation of intestinal stem cells and enterocytes necessary for epithelium cell renewal. They express the canonical Wnt ligands: Wnt3a, Wnt9b, and Wnt11, which bind to Frizzled receptors on intestinal stem cells to drive β-catenin/Tcf signaling. Paneth cells are also a major source of Notch ligands DLL1 and DLL4, binding to Notch receptors Notch1 and Notch2 on intestinal stem cells and enterocyte progenitors. 

Recently, however, it has been discovered that the regenerative potential of intestinal epithelial cells declines over time as a result of aged Paneth cells secreting the protein Notum, which is an extracellular inhibitor of Wnt signaling. If Notum secretion is inhibited, the regenerative potential of the intestinal epithelium could increase.

Disease 
Abnormal Paneth cells with reduced expression or secretion of defensins HD-5 and HD-6 (in human) and antimicrobial peptides is associated with inflammatory bowel disease. In addition to that, several of the Crohn’s disease-risk alleles associated with Paneth cell dysfunction are involved in processes such as autophagy, the unfolded protein response, and the regulation of mitochondrial function.

It is believed that dysfunction of Paneth cells compromises antimicrobial peptides leading to a microbiota composition shift, even dysbiosis. Crohn’s disease patients with a higher percentage of abnormal Paneth cells showed significantly reduced bacterial diversity compared with patients with a lower percentage of abnormal Paneth cells, reflecting a reduced abundance of anti-inflammatory microbes. Collectively, these findings support the theory that Paneth cell dysfunction may lead to a dysbiotic microbiota, which in turn, could predispose to the development of Crohn’s disease. However, it is yet to be established, whether Paneth cell dysfunction is the cause of dysbiosis, or it's concomitant effect.

See also 

 List of human cell types derived from the germ layers

References 

 Bibliography

 
 

Epithelial cells
Human cells
Gastroenterology